The 2015–16 Austrian Football Bundesliga  was the 104th season of top-tier football in Austria. Red Bull Salzburg were the defending champions.

Division
The Bundesliga is the highest division in Austrian football. Which took place in the 2015/16 season for the 42nd time and determined the 104. Austrian soccer champion. The main sponsor was, as for the two previous years, the sports betting company Tipico, which is the reason  why the official league name is Tipico Bundesliga.

Salzburg and Vienna each had two teams, Burgenland, Carinthia, Lower Austria, Upper Austria, Styria and Vorarlberg each had one. Tyrol was the only  state without a team in Austria's highest league. In the 2014/15 season, the SC Wiener Neustadt went down into the First League, while the SV Mattersburg moved up.

The TV provider Sky Germany AG had the rights to show all Bundesliga games in full-length which were broadcast on the Sky sport Austria pay television channel. The channel broadcast all games as conference calls and  individually.  In addition, the ORF had the rights to broadcast a game of their choice, which was as a single match labeled the "top match of the round" – which usually took place  Sundays, when the midweek rounds were on Wednesdays. This was not possible though in the last two rounds where  all games had to be broadcast simultaneously. In addition, the ORF was allowed to show a 45-minute summary of the remaining four games of each round.

Mode
In the 2015/16 season were ten clubs in 36 rounds against each other, as in previous years. Each team played twice at home and twice away against every other team.

Because the European Cup results of the Austrian team in the 2014–15 season, they fell at the end of the season back to 16th place of the UEFA coefficient. Therefore, the Bundesliga and the ÖFB Cup played only one starting position for the Champions League and two in the Europa League in the 2015/16 season. The champions of the Bundesliga is entitled to participate in the qualification for the UEFA Champions League and rises to the second qualifying round: The cup winners, runners-up and third place in the Bundesliga games, play in the qualification for the UEFA Europa League and depending on the results, get in the third, second or first round in the competition. The initial rounds can shift due to the selection of players in favor of the Austrian National Team, from the defending champion of the Champions League or Europa League. After the Cup victory went to FC Red Bull Salzburg, who qualified for the Champions League, the fourth international position fell to the fourth place team in the Bundesliga. Coincidentally, this was also the Cup finalist, FC Admira Wacker Mödling.
The last placed team in the top division, the Bundesliga, SV Grödig, should have relegated to the First League, but withdrew from the professional sector at the end of the season.

Teams 
SV Mattersburg, the 2014–15 First League champion, returned to the top level two years after their relegation.

Stadia and locations

Personnel and kits

League table

Results

First half of season

Second half of season

Season statistics

Top goalscorers
.

Top assists
.

Positions by round
The table lists the positions of teams after each week of matches. In order to preserve chronological evolvements, any postponed matches are not included in the round at which they were originally scheduled, but added to the full round they were played immediately afterwards. For example, if a match is scheduled for matchday 13, but then postponed and played between days 16 and 17, it will be added to the standings for day 16.

Awards

Annual awards

Player of the Year 

The Player of the Year awarded to  Naby Keïta 
(Red Bull Salzburg)

Top goalscorer  

The Top goalscorer of the Year awarded to  Jonathan Soriano (Red Bull Salzburg)

Goalkeeper of the Year 

The Goalkeeper of the Year awarded to  Alexander Walke 
(Red Bull Salzburg)

Attendances

References

External links

  

Austrian Football Bundesliga seasons
Aus
1